The 2013 Russian Football Super Cup (Russian: Суперкубок России по футболу) was the 11th Russian Super Cup match, a football match which was contested between the 2012–13 Russian Premier League and 2012–13 Russian Cup champion CSKA Moscow, and the runner-up of the 2012–13 Russian Premier League, Zenit Saint Petersburg.

The match was held on 13 July 2013 at the Olimp-2, in Rostov.

Match details

See also
2013–14 Russian Premier League
2013–14 Russian Cup

References

Super Cup
Russian Super Cup
Russian Super Cup 2013
Russian Super Cup 2013
Sport in Rostov-on-Don